Ivan Petrovich Pranishnikoff (May 3, 1841, Kursk region - April 16 , 1909, Saintes-Maries-de-la-Mer) was a Russian painter, illustrator, archaeological prospector, and traveler. At the end of his life he moved to Saintes-Maries-de-la-Mer in the Camargue, where he died.

References 

Russian painters
Russian illustrators
People of Camargue